is a  mountain in the Tanjō Mountains, located in Sakamoto, Yamada, Kita-ku, Kobe, Hyōgo, Japan.

Outline and History 
Mount Tanjō is not the tallest mountain of Tanjō Mountains, but it is a symbol of the mountain range. In the middle of the mountain, there was a Buddhist temple Myōyō-ji which was said to be established by Donan-Gyoja, a prince of King Seong of Baekje. Today's Tanjō Shrine was is believed to be part of the original temple.
Mount Tanjō is also believed to have been old source of mercury, because the name Tanjō, originally means Nyu, mercury. Tanjō Shrine is a place to enshrine a goddess of mercury.

Access 
 Tanjō Jinja Mae Bus Stop of Kobe City Bus
 Tsukihara Bus Stop of Kobe City Bus

References
 ‘Kansaishuhen no Yama 250’, Yama to Keikokusha Osakashikyoku
 Official Home Page of the Geographical Survey Institute in Japan

Gallery

Tanjosan